Ingalahalli is a village in Dharwad district of Karnataka, India.

Demographics 
As of the 2011 Census of India there were 1,062 households in Ingalhalli and a total population of 4,917 consisting of 2,485 males and 2,432 females. There were 533 children ages 0-6.

References

Villages in Dharwad district